Glaucina is a genus of moths in the family Geometridae erected by George Duryea Hulst in 1896.

Species
 Glaucina ampla Rindge, 1959
 Glaucina anomala Rindge, 1959
 Glaucina baea Rindge, 1959
 Glaucina biartata Rindge, 1959
 Glaucina bifida Rindge, 1959
 Glaucina cilla Rindge, 1959
 Glaucina denticularia (Dyar, 1907)
 Glaucina dispersa Rindge, 1959
 Glaucina elongata (Hulst, 1896)
 Glaucina epiphysaria Dyar, 1908
 Glaucina erroraria Dyar, 1907
 Glaucina escaria (Grote, 1882)
 Glaucina eupetheciaria (Grote, 1883)
 Glaucina eureka Grossbeck, 1912
 Glaucina golgolata (Strecker, 1899)
 Glaucina gonia Rindge, 1959
 Glaucina ignavaria (Pearsall, 1906)
 Glaucina imperdata (Dyar, 1915)
 Glaucina infumataria (Grote, 1877)
 Glaucina interruptaria (Grote, 1882)
 Glaucina lowensis (Cassino & Swett, 1925)
 Glaucina loxa Rindge, 1959
 Glaucina macdunnoughi (Grossbeck, 1912)
 Glaucina magnifica Grossbeck, 1912
 Glaucina mayelisaria Blanchard, 1966
 Glaucina nephos Rindge, 1959
 Glaucina nota Rindge, 1912
 Glaucina ochrofuscaria (Grote, 1882)
 Glaucina platia Rindge, 1959
 Glaucina spaldingata (Cassino & Swett, 1923)
 Glaucina utahensis (Cassino & Swett, 1924)

References

Boarmiini
Taxa named by George Duryea Hulst
Geometridae genera